The BMW R60/6, R75/6, R90/6 and the sport model BMW R90S form a range of boxer twin motorcycles that were manufactured in Berlin, Germany, by BMW from 1974 to 1976.  The "slash six" models departed from the earlier "slash five" slightly. First, the smallest displacement changed from 500cc to 600cc. A sport model was offered, as were disc brakes (front only) for the first time.  Additionally, the tank design was changed to remove the chrome trim panels (rubber knee pads were added instead), and the gauge pod was moved from the headlight housing to its own assembly over the housing.

Technical data
Like the preceding /5 bikes, the /6 models are air-cooled, four-stroke, opposed-twin (boxer) engines with hemispherical combustion chambers. The engine is built around a one-piece tunnel crank-case. The camshaft is driven by a duplex chain and is located below the crankshaft. Valves are actuated by the camshaft through hardened followers, push rods, and rocker arms. The same base 247 engine was used for these motorcycles.

Final drive is by shaft, running from the transmission by universal joint to an oil bath within the right rear swing arm and connecting to a bevel gear and ring gear on the other end. Like the /5 models, the /6 models are equipped with telescopic front forks, 12-volt alternator and electrics, and standard tachometer and turn signals.

R
Motorcycles powered by flat engines
Shaft drive motorcycles
Standard motorcycles
Motorcycles introduced in 1974